Baba Ghassem mausoleum is a historical mausoleum in Isfahan, Iran. It dates back to the 14th century. It is well known for its beautiful mihrab and dome. It is located to the north of Jameh Mosque of Isfahan. It was repaired and revamped in the Safavid era. Baba Ghassem was one of the prominent faqihs in Isfahan. One of his devotees built the Emamieh school for him, when Baba Ghassem was alive and after Baba Ghassem's death, he built this mausoleum for him. The tomb has brick and tile decorations. Its dome is pyramidical. This mausoleum was very respected in the past, so much so that people generally swore to it beside the tomb for proving that they are telling the truth. On the lower part of the dome of the structure, one of the names of Allah has been written in the Bannai script.

References 

Buildings and structures completed in the 14th century
Mausoleums in Isfahan